Right to Philosophy is a 1990 book by the French philosopher Jacques Derrida. It collects all of Derrida's writings, from 1975 till 1990, on the issue of the teaching of philosophy, the academic institution and the politics of philosophy in school and in the university. It has been translated in English in two volumes: Who's Afraid of Philosophy?: Right to Philosophy 1 (2002), and Eyes of the University: Right to Philosophy 2 (2004).

Contents
Volume 1 contains the essay Where a Teaching Body Begins and How It Ends, (pp. 67–91) first published separately in 1976 in France; and the 1977 essay The Age of Hegel (pp. 117–157).

Notes and references

Further reading
Derrida's The Right to Philosophy from the Cosmopolitical Point of View (1997)
Derrida's interview with Robert Maggiori, Once Again from the Top: Of the Right to Philosophy, in Libération, November 15, 1990, republished in Points...: Interviews, 1974-1994 (1995).

External links
Who's afraid of philosophy?: Right to philosophy 1
Eyes of the university: Right to philosophy 2
 Peter Trifonas Jacques Derrida as a Philosopher of Education, Encyclopaedia of Philosophy of Education

1990 non-fiction books
2002 non-fiction books
2004 non-fiction books
Books about education
Education reform
Philosophy books
Works by Jacques Derrida